Barikeh-ye Nezam-e Olya (also Romanized as Bārīkeh-ye Nez̧ām-e ‘Olyā; also known as Bārīkeh-ye Bālā, Bārīkeh-ye Nez̧ām, Bārīkeh-ye ‘Olyā, Qal‘eh Āgha Nizām, and Qal‘eh-ye Āqā Nez̧ām) is a village in Harasam Rural District, Homeyl District, Eslamabad-e Gharb County, Kermanshah Province, Iran. In the 2006 census, 121 families lived in the village for a population of 550.

References 

Populated places in Eslamabad-e Gharb County